Albany State University is a public historically black university in Albany, Georgia. In 2017, Darton State College and Albany State University consolidated to become one university under the University System of Georgia (USG). Albany State University has two campuses in Albany (East and West Campus) and a satellite campus in Cordele (Cordele Center).

History

Establishment and growth

Joseph Winthrop Holley, born in 1874 to former slaves in Winnsboro, South Carolina,  founded the institution in 1903 as the Albany Bible and Manual Training Institute. Two educators, Reverend Samuel Lane Loomis and his wife, sent Holley to Brainerd Institute and then Revere Lay College (Massachusetts). When attending Revere Lay, Holley got to know one of the school's trustees, New England businessman Rowland Hazard. After taking a liking to Holley, Hazard arranged for him to continue his education at Phillips Academy in Andover, Massachusetts. Holley aspired to become a minister and prepared by completing his education at Pennsylvania's Lincoln University.

W. E. B. Du Bois inspired Holley to return to the South after he read Du Bois's writings on the plight of Albany's blacks in The Souls of Black Folk. Holley relocated to Albany to start a school. With the help of a $2,600 gift from the Hazard family, Holley organized a board of trustees and purchased  of land for the campus, all within a year. The aim of the institution at the time was to provide elementary education and teacher training for the local Black population.

The institution was turned over to the state of Georgia in 1917 as Georgia Normal and Agricultural College, a two-year agricultural and teacher-training institution.

In 1932, the school became part of the University System of Georgia and in 1943 it was granted four-year status and renamed Albany State College. The transition to four-year status heavily increased the school's enrollment.

In 1981 the college offered its first graduate program, a prelude to the school being upgraded to university status in 1996.

In July 1994, most of the campus was flooded and suffered extensive damage when Tropical Storm Alberto caused the Flint River to overflow.  Afterwards, the campus was extended towards the east with many new buildings erected on the higher ground.

Albany State University era

In July 1996, the Board of Regents of the University System of Georgia approved the change from college to university and the name of Albany State College officially became Albany State University.
 
A new stadium was opened in 2004 and new housing units opened in 2006.

In 2015, the Board of Regents of the University System of Georgia announced the merger of ASU and Darton State College. In 2017, the institutions consolidated and assumed the name and branding of Albany State University, with the Darton College campus becoming the site of Albany State University's Darton College of Health Professions.

Enrollment was expected to be around 9,000 students. However, the combined enrollment decreased significantly.  Fall 2013 enrollments were 6,195 for Darton State College and 4,260 for Albany State University while Fall 2017 enrollments for the new combined Albany State University were 6,615. This represents a 27% decrease over that period.

Due to the consolidation with Darton, Albany State became the largest HBCU in the state of Georgia and one of the 15 largest in the United States.

Civil Rights Movement

The college played  a significant role in the Civil Rights Movement in the early 1960s. Many students from the school, Black improvement organizations, and representatives from the Student Nonviolent Coordinating Committee (SNCC) came together to create the Albany Movement. The movement brought prominent civil rights leaders to the town including Martin Luther King Jr. and resulted in the arrests of more than 1,000 black protestors. Among the first to be arrested were students from Albany State.

On November 22, 1961, Blanton Hall and Bertha Gober entered the white waiting room of the Albany bus station to buy tickets home for the Thanksgiving holiday. Refusing to leave after being ordered to do so, police arrested them both. Albany State President William Dennis, fearful of losing his position, immediately suspended and eventually expelled the students. This action engendered a great deal of animosity from the black community and the student body.

Gober would continue in the civil rights movement as one of the SNCC's Freedom Singers and write the group's anthem. Bernice Johnson Reagon, another Albany State student who left school to work with the SNCC, would later form the well-known a cappella group Sweet Honey in the Rock.  On December 10, 2011, thirty two of the students who were expelled were granted honorary degrees. The school awarded thirty one honorary baccalaureate degrees and one honorary doctorate – that to Bernice Johnson Reagon. A noted cultural historian, Reagon was also the commencement speaker.

Presidents

Joseph Winthrop Holley served as President of the school from 1903 to 1943. He was succeeded by Aaron Brown (1943–1954), William Dennis (1954–1965), Thomas Miller Jenkins (1965–1969), Charles Hayes (1969–1980), Billy C. Black (1980–1996), Portia Holmes Shields (1996–2005), Everette J. Freeman (2005 – 2013), Art Dunning (2015-2018), and Marion Ross Fedrick (2018-).

Academics

Albany State offers undergraduate and graduate liberal arts and professional degree programs.

According to U.S. News & World Report, in 2019 ASU was ranked 40th (tie) in the magazine's ranking of undergraduate education at HBCUs and was ranked as the 107th-141st school on the Regional Universities (South) list. The student-faculty ratio is 15:1 and 42 percent of the classes contain less than 20 students. The most popular majors are health professions and related, homeland security, law enforcement, firefighting and related, business,  management, marketing, psychology, and education. The Velma Fudge Grant Honors Program is a selective program that caters to high-achieving undergraduate students.

Academic colleges and units

 College of Arts and Sciences
 College of Professional Studies
 Darton College of Health Professions
 Distance Learning

The institution offers 13 certificates, 14 associate, 30 baccalaureate, and 12 graduate degrees. The university also offers the Board of Regents' engineering transfer program and a dual degree program with the Georgia Institute of Technology, one of the top engineering schools in the nation. The Holley Institute summer program, which consists of an intense four weeks of study to help high school students improve low SAT scores and gain admission to college, has a near 100 percent success rate and has received praise from the state Board of Regents.

Campuses
Albany State University East campus (Main)  is located at 504 College Drive, 206 acres east of the Flint River. It has 32 buildings and five sport facilities.

Albany State University West campus (formerly Darton State College) is located at 2400 Gillionville Road,  on 186 acres in West Albany. It has 16 buildings and five sport facilities.  It is the site of the Darton College of Health Professions.

ASU also has a center in Cordele and provides specific courses at sites in Cairo, Waycross, Thomasville, Swainsboro, and Sandersville.

Demographics
Albany State University student body consists of both traditional and non-traditional students who number nearly 6,500 on campus. These students come primarily from Atlanta and Southwest and Central Georgia. The average student age is 24, and about 40 percent of the students live in on-campus housing.  In fall 2019, 72.9% of the enrolled students were female, with 1,661 males and 4,461 females out of the total of 6,122, while 5.2% were Hispanic/Latino (of any race), .2% American Indian or Alaska Native, .8% Asian, 74.5% Black/African American, and 13.8% White.

Student life

Student organizations
There are over 60 clubs and organizations including bands, choirs, religious groups, honor societies, several Greek and honor sororities and fraternities, and ROTC.

Fraternities and Sororities
All nine of the National Pan-Hellenic Council organizations currently have chapters at Albany State University. These organizations are:

Service fraternities and sororities

There are currently two national service fraternities and sororities at Albany State University. These organizations are:

Music organizations
Three Greek music organizations have chapters at Albany State University. These organizations are:

Marching Rams Show Band
Albany State's marching band participated in the 2007, 2008, 2010, 2011, 2012, and 2013 Honda Battle of the Bands (HBOB).  Also,
The Marching Rams Show Band participated in the 2016 Tournament of Roses Parade and Tournament of Roses Bandfest.

Albany State's marching band danceline is named the "Golden Passionettes". In 2012, the danceline was invited to appear in the "Give It 2 U" music video and live performance with artists Robin Thicke, Kendrick Lamar, and 2 Chainz.

Athletics

Albany State University holds membership in NCAA Division II (as a member of the Southern Intercollegiate Athletic Conference) and participates in the following sports: football, basketball, baseball, golf, cheerleading, volleyball, cross-country and track and field. Additionally, in 2019 ASU's women soccer team will begin competing in the Peach Belt Conference. Through BSN Sports, Nike is the current sponsor of the Albany State University Athletic Department.

Swimming

Albany State sponsored men's and women's swimming, and diving teams, which in past years were named National Black College Swimming and Diving Champions in 1979 and 1980.

Notable alumni

This is a list of notable alumni which includes graduates, non-graduate former students, and current students of Albany State University. It also reflects those alumni who attended and/or graduated from the institution under its prior historical names.

References

Suggested reading

External links
 
 Official athletics website

 
Public universities and colleges in Georgia (U.S. state)
Historically black universities and colleges in the United States
Tourist attractions in Albany, Georgia
Education in Dougherty County, Georgia
Educational institutions established in 1903
Universities and colleges accredited by the Southern Association of Colleges and Schools
Buildings and structures in Albany, Georgia
1903 establishments in Georgia (U.S. state)
University System of Georgia